Graduate First is a 1978 French drama film directed by Maurice Pialat and starring Sabine Haudepin. The film is set in the north of France, in Lens, in a region profoundly affected by unemployment – the students, from modest backgrounds, try to forget their fears of what tomorrow will bring.

Plot
The film is an "unsparing portrait of teenage life in the French suburbs [that] sees a group of schoolfriends adrift at the end of the 1970s. There's drama, violence, and pot-induced laughs, group holidays, indiscriminate sex, advances from teachers twenty-five years their seniors, attempted moves to Paris – and few prospects of passing the Baccalauréat, the final set of exams French students take before embarking into the world... to do what?

Marking the last work of Pialat's turbulent cycle of 1970s films, this is the sequel to the filmmaker's feature debut L'enfance nue (1969) – picked up again from a vantage point ten years on from the lives of the earlier film's protagonists."

Cast
 Sabine Haudepin as Élisabeth
  as Philippe
 Annick Alane as La mère (as Annik Alane)
 Michel Caron as Le père
 Christian Bouillette as Le vieux dragueur
 Bernard Tronczyk as Bernard
 Patrick Lepcynski as Patrick
 Valérie Chassigneux as Valérie
 Jean-François Adam as Le professeur de philosophie
 Agnès Makowiak as Agnès
 Charline Pourré as Charline
 Patrick Playez as Rocky, le marié
 Muriel Lacroix as Muriel
 Frédérique Cerbonnet as Frédérique
 Fabienne Neuville as La soeur d'Élizabeth
 Aline Fayard as La femme du patron

References

External links
 

1978 films
1978 drama films
1970s teen drama films
Films set in France
French teen drama films
1970s French-language films
Films directed by Maurice Pialat
1970s French films